Moorhouseite is a rare mineral with the formula CoSO4•6H2O, a naturally occurring cobalt(II) sulfate hexahydrate. It is the lower-hydrate-equivalent of bieberite (heptahydrate) and aplowite (hexahydrate). It is also hydrated equivalent of cobaltkieserite. It occurs together with moorhouseite within efflorescences found in the Magnet Cove Barium Corporation mine in Walton, Nova Scotia, Canada.

Notes on chemistry
Relatively high amounts of nickel and manganese were reported, with trace amounts of copper and iron.

Crystal structure
Analysis of synthetic analogue of moorhouseite revealed, that its structure may be described as containing:
 Co(H2O)6 octahedra, forming alternate layers
 SO4 tetrahedra
 hydrogen bonds (two per a single water molecule)

References

Sulfate minerals
Cobalt minerals